There are three communities in the U.S. state of North Carolina named Frog Level:
 Frog Level, Pitt County, North Carolina, a community on the outskirts of Greenville, North Carolina
 Frog Level, Rutherford County, North Carolina, a community in Spindale, North Carolina
Frog Level, Waynesville, North Carolina, a neighborhood in western North Carolina municipality of Waynesville
Frog Level Historic District, Waynesville, North Carolina, a part of the neighborhood listed on the NRHP

See also
Frog Level (disambiguation)